The Basilica of Ballsh is a Cultural Monument of Albania, located in Ballsh, Fier County.

References

Cultural Monuments of Albania
Buildings and structures in Mallakastër
Tourist attractions in Fier County